Pacyna  (1943–1945, German Patzingen) is a village in Gostynin County, Masovian Voivodeship, in east-central Poland. It is the seat of the gmina (administrative district) called Gmina Pacyna.

The village has a population of 220.

References

External links 

Pacyna